Dancing with the Stars is a Greek reality show airing on ANT1 and filming live in Athens. Returned for its fifth season on October 26, 2014 from ANT1 TV channel. The show is based on the United Kingdom BBC Television series Strictly Come Dancing and is part of BBC Worldwide's Dancing with the Stars franchise. The theme song is "It's personal" performed by Swedish indie pop band The Radio Dept.

The host of this season will be Doukissa Nomikou. Giannis Latsios, Alexis Kostalas, Galena Velikova and Katia Dandoulaki returned as the judges of the show. Lakis Gavalas is the fifth judge in fifth season of the show.

The celebrities who were competed this season were 8 women and 6 men; Christina Aloupi, Maria Iliaki, Nikoleta Karra, Niki Kartsona, Morfoula Ntona, Eirini Papadopoulou, Thalia Prokopiou, Elisavet Spanou, Theoxaris Ioannidis, Fanis Lampropoulos, Thanos Petrelis, Christos Spanos, Triantafyllos and Thanasis Viskadourakis. The professional partners were revealed on October 22, 2014.

The premiere of the show the 14 couples danced for the first time 14 different dances.

After the 3rd live Kartsona's partner left the show for personal reasons and his place was taken by Vladimir Morotsko who had just left the actress Thalia Prokopiou in 3rd live.

In week 6 the ten couples were divided into five groups. The two couples each group danced the same dance and one of the two couples received two extra points. If both had ties going through one point.

In week 7 the couples danced to songs of their choice. At the end of the evening one of the couples would win immunity and will be excluded from the process of withdrawal from next week. Also in the 7 week there was redundancy.

In 10th live Nikoleta Karra did not dance because of her partner's accident.

In 11th live two couples did not dance, Theocharis Ioannidis due to professional obligations and Christos Spanos because of an accident he had, leading to his withdrawal. Αlso in 11th live could not dance again the Nikoletta Karra's partner could not dance again and was replaced by Alexandros Papadopoulos.

Judges
Alexis Kostalas, announcer, sports commentator
Galena Velikova, choreographer, dancer, dance teacher. Galena has also been a judge at Dancing Stars, the Bulgarian version of the show, for seasons 1&3.
Giannis Latsios, ANT1 television program manager
Katia Dandoulaki, actress
Lakis Gavalas, Fashion designer

Couples

Scoring chart

Red numbers indicate the lowest score for each week
Green numbers indicate the highest score for each week
 the couple got the lowest score of the night and was eliminated that week
 the couple eliminated that week
 the returning couple finishing in the bottom two
 the couple danced, but not scored
 this couple withdrew from the competition
 the winning couple
 the runner-up couple
 the third-place couple
 the couple did not dance this week

In 12th live Theoxaris & Anastasia were deducted four points off their two dances on the scoring chart because they did not dance on the previous live.

Average score chart 
This table only counts for dances scored on a traditional 50-points scale.

Highest and lowest scoring performances

Couples' highest and lowest scoring dances
According to the traditional 50-point scale:

Weekly scores
Unless indicated otherwise, individual judges scores in the charts below (given in parentheses) are listed in this order from left to right: Alexis Kostalas, Galena Velikova, Giannis Latsios, Katia Dandoulaki and Lakis Gavalas.

Week 1  
Running order

Week 2  
Running order

Week 3  
Running order

Week 4: Greek night  
Running order

Week 5: Movie night  
Running order

Week 6: Duel night  
Running order

Week 7: Favorite song  
 This week the couple with the highest combined score from judges and viewers got immunity and was safe for next week.
 There was no elimination this week.

Running order

Week 8  
Nomikou announced during the live show that Morfoula, who won the immunity the previous week, was not going to get scored for her dance.

Running order

Week 9: Christmas show
All the couples competed in a Christmas Swing Marathon. The winner couple took 5 extra points from the judges while the rest couples didn't get scored.

Running order

Week 10: New Year's Eve show
Running order

Week 11: Instant Dance Challenge
Running order

Week 12: Iconic dance night 
Running order

Week 13: Semi-Finals (Solo & Trio challenge) 

For the trio challenge the couples were partnered with a previous season. The couples chose their third partner by drawing envelopes at the end of the show of week 12. Ntona danced with Pantazi (season 4), Papadopoulou danced with Stikoudi (season 4) & Karra danced with Synatsaki (season 4).
Running order

Week 14: Finals 

Running order

Dance chart 
 Week 1:  14 different dances (Cha-cha-cha, Bachata, Salsa, Tango, Samba, Waltz, Viennese Waltz, Foxtrot, Jive, Paso Doble, Argentine tango, Quickstep, Mambo, Rumba)
 Week 2: 7 different dances (Cha-cha-cha, Foxtrot, Jive, Argentine tango, Bachata, Paso Doble, Viennese Waltz)
 Week 3: 10 different dances (Paso Doble, European tango, Quickstep, Cha-cha-cha, Argentine tango, Mambo, Viennese Waltz, Foxtrot, Jive, Salsa)
 Week 4: Greek night (Freestyle)
 Week 5: Movie night (Quickstep, Viennese Waltz, Jive, Argentine tango, Paso Doble)
 Week 6: Duel night (Paso Doble, Salsa, Foxtrot, Mambo, Viennese Waltz)
 Week 7: Favorite song (Lambada, Contemporary, Paso Doble & Contemporary, Foxtrot, Bollywood, Merengue & Disco, Rumba)
 Week 8: 8 different dances (Salsa, Paso Doble, Quickstep, Mambo, Argentine tango, Cha-cha-cha, Bachata, Jive)
 Week 9: Freestyle & Christmas Swing Marathon (Christmas show)
 Week 10: 1st dance (Paso Doble, Samba, Quickstep, Viennese Waltz, Argentine tango, Rumba) & Freestyle
 Week 11: 4 different dances (Quickstep, Foxtrot, Samba, Viennese Waltz) & Instant Dance (Cha-cha-cha, Argentine tango, Quickstep, Jive)
 Week 12: 4 different dances (Paso Doble, Quickstep, Rumba, Samba) & Iconic dance night (Contemporary, Viennese Waltz, Paso Doble, Freestyle)
 Week 13: Semi-Finals (Solo & Trio challenge), Solo (Freestyle) & Trio challenge (Paso Doble, Argentine tango, Samba)
 Week 14: Finals (1st part: Quickstep, European tango), (2nd part: Cha-cha-cha) & Dance-off (Freestyle)

 Highest scoring dance
 Lowest scoring dance
 Danced, but not scored
 Eliminated for this week
 Returning for the bottom two
 Withdrew from the competition
 Gained bonus points for this dance
 Highest score of the week and won immunity for next week
 Not danced

Guest performances

Ratings

References

External links
Official website of Dancing with the Stars Greece

Season 05
2014 Greek television seasons
2015 Greek television seasons